Andrzej Józef Nowak (7 February 1956 – 30 May 2013) was a Polish ice hockey player. He played for the Poland men's national ice hockey team at the 1984 Winter Olympics in Sarajevo.

References

1956 births
2013 deaths
Ice hockey players at the 1984 Winter Olympics
Olympic ice hockey players of Poland
People from Nowy Targ County
Polish ice hockey defencemen
Podhale Nowy Targ players